Aoife Walsh (born 2 August 1989) is a fashion model and former Miss Ireland from Tipperary, Ireland.

Career
Walsh has a Bachelor of Arts in economics and geography, a master's degree in business management and a master's degree in education.

In 2013, Walsh was crowned Miss Ireland. She went on to represent Ireland at the Miss World competition, where she placed in the top ten in the talent category.

Since winning Miss Ireland, Walsh has carved out a successful modeling career, walking at New York fashion week in 2017. In addition, she started her own blog entitled 'That Ginger Chick', which focuses on fashion, travel, beauty, and lifestyle.

Personal life
Walsh has spoken out about being bullied for her red hair.

References 

Irish female models
1989 births
Living people
People from Clonmel
Beauty pageant contestants from Ireland
Miss World 2013 delegates